Neil Kevin Hennessy (born December 12, 1978) is a punk rock musician, music producer and engineer from Chicago, Illinois.

Hennessy currently plays in The Lawrence Arms, Colossal, The Falcon, The Smoking Popes, The Treasure Fleet and Demon Beach. He has also been a member of Noise By Numbers, Baxter, The Killing Tree, Quattro and played multiple shows with Teenage Bottlerocket. In late 2015, Hennessy took over rhythm guitar duties in fellow Chicago punk band Rise Against during their European tour. Rise Against frontman and vocalist guitarist Tim McIlrath had broken his hand and was unable to play guitar, forcing him to singing exclusively.

Hennessy works at Atlas Studios in Chicago with Matt Allison. He co-wrote the Rise Against song "Swing Life Away" with McIlrath, and also played percussion on the Less Than Jake album, GNV FLA.

Hennessy usually uses a Slingerland (1970s) drum kit, Zildjian cymbals, and Remo heads.

References 

1978 births
Living people
Musicians from Chicago
American punk rock musicians
Smoking Popes members
The Lawrence Arms members
The Falcon (band) members
Noise by Numbers members
Sundowner (band) members